Tasman is a rare family name in the diaspora of Dutch people. The distribution of people with the surname varies from about 6000 in Indonesia to small numbers in Australia and New Zealand, while by 2007 only seven people with the name lived in the  Netherlands. The most notable bearer of this name was the Dutch explorer Abel Tasman.

Origin
Cornelis Gerritsz Tasman of Schellinkhout was an early 17th century skipper on the 140-ton ship De Tas, literally "the bag". At the time it was common for ship captains to adopt the name of their ships. The family Tas or Tasman - not related to Abel Janszoon Tasman, who came from Lutjegast in Groningen - counted so many seamen in the late 1600s that their ships were divided in color: De Zwarte Tas ("black bag") of Jan Tasman, De Groene Tas ("green bag") of Pieter Janszoon Tasman, De Roode Tas ("red bag") of Pieter Corneliszoon Tasman and De Witte Tas (white bag) of Wigger Tasman.

The name Tasman could also be related to the German surname Tessmann, which is made of the Slavic 'tešiti', meaning 'consolation' and the German 'Mann'.

People
People with the name include:
 surname
 Abel Tasman (1603–1659), Dutch explorer
 Marc Tasman (born 1971), American multimedia artist
 William Tasman (1929-2017), American ophthalmologist
 given name
 Raymond Tasman Donoghue (1920–1960), Australian tram driver
 Lindsay Tasman Ride (1898–1977), Australian physiologist, soldier and Vice Chancellor of the University of Hong Kong
 Tasman Drake (1884–1946), New Zealand Anglican clergyman and cricketer
 Tasman Forth (1885–1964), Australian Odinist
 Tasman Heyes (1896–1980), Australian public servant
 Tasman Higgins (1888–1953), Australian cinematographer
 Tasman Keith, Australian rapper
 Tasman Knight (1906–1987), Australian rules footballer
 Tasman Long (1875–1926), Australian cricketer
 Tasman Joseph McKee (1911–1973), New Zealand chemist and geologist
 Tasman Roberts (1901–1942), Australian rules footballer
 Tasman Shields (1872–1950), Australian politician

References

Surnames of Dutch origin
Lists of people by surname